Thierry Devergie (born 27 July 1966 in Marseille) is a French former rugby union footballer. He played as a lock and as a flanker. He also had a brief stint as a professional rugby league footballer.

Career
Devergie played for RC Nîmes and for FC Grenoble (1994/95) in rugby union. He played a season for Paris Saint-Germain Rugby League (1995/96), returning to his previous code afterwards. He played for the Welsh team Neath RFC in the season of 1997/98, moving to Bristol Shoguns, in England the same season. Returning to France he would represent CA Brive (1998/99) and CA Bordeaux-Bègles Gironde (1999/2000). He finished his career aged 33 years old.

Devergie had 17 caps for France, from 1988 to 1992, without ever scoring. He had 4 caps at the 1990 Five Nations Championship. He was selected for the 1991 Rugby World Cup but never left the bench.

External links

1966 births
Sportspeople from Marseille
CA Brive players
Footballers who switched code
France international rugby union players
French rugby league players
French rugby union players
Living people
Paris Saint-Germain Rugby League players
Rugby union locks
CA Bordeaux-Bègles Gironde players
FC Grenoble players
Neath RFC players
Expatriate rugby union players in Wales
Expatriate rugby union players in England
French expatriate rugby union players
Bristol Bears players
French expatriate sportspeople in England
French expatriate sportspeople in Wales